Harmful Intent (1990) is a novel by Robin Cook. Like most of Cook's other work, it is a medical thriller.

Social concerns and themes 

Harmful Intent takes on a different type of medical-related target: ambulance-chasing lawyers. Cook asks the reader to imagine how well malpractice attorneys could do if they hired someone to sabotage a doctor's work and create a situation that is virtually unexplainable except by the doctor's negligence. In effect, the lawyers create a demand for their services by supplying victims. This scenario is arguably the most farfetched of all Cook's schemes, and yet—given the numbers of lawyers charged with unethical practices—is not implausible in the realm of fiction.

To a lesser degree, Cook explores the turmoil of a physician whose life and career have been ruined, ostensibly because of a mistake.

Cook questions the integrity and professionalism of attorneys who are trained to uphold the law and protect others from victimization, but who line their pockets illegally from the misfortune of others. Cook demonstrates that society is vulnerable to the alienated, anonymous individual who harbours an impersonal grudge against humanity. It is seemingly impossible to bring this kind of criminal to justice—for there is no justice. Society's greed, fueled by avaricious lawyers, has twisted the lawsuit from an attempt to render justice into a mindless dispensation of money as a balm for pain.

Characters 
Dr. Jeffrey Rhodes is a painstakingly thorough anesthesiologist whose patient dies after he administers a routine drug. Brought to trial and found guilty of negligence and murder, he faces a probable jail sentence. Rather than go to prison, he jumps bail and is nearly caught at the airport by a bounty hunter. Dr. Rhodes sets off to track down what caused the inexplicable reaction in his patient. While trying to justify his professional competence, he stumbles across a lead—notes left by a Dr. Christopher Everson, who committed suicide soon after being ruined by a case similar to his own. Rhodes enlists the aid of nurse Kelly Everson, Everson's widow, to gather the evidence he needs to clear himself. Dr. Rhodes combines sharp wits with good luck as he assumes a false identity to uncover details of the scheme that has caused his downfall. He infiltrates his old place of employment, visits the morgue and coroner, and even manages to have a corpse exhumed illegally—all while the police are searching for him. The character of nurse Everson is not well developed but provides Rhodes with someone to turn to as he tries to avoid the police. The romance that develops between them is all too predictable.

Devlin O'Shea, the bounty hunter, complicates Rhodes's life by pursuing him after he jumps bail. Turning up at unexpected times and places, he is responsible for much of the novel's suspense. An ex-cop dismissed from the force because of an error in judgment, he eventually comes to identify with Rhodes's plight. Trent Harding is an unstable nurse, whose hatred of authority, and need to bolster his self-image, make him susceptible to an unscrupulous law firm's offer of employment.

1990 American novels
Novels by Robin Cook
Medical novels